They Don't Know is the seventh studio album by American country music artist Jason Aldean. It was released on September 9, 2016 via Broken Bow Records. Its lead single, "Lights Come On", was released on April 1, 2016 and has reached number one on the Country Airplay chart. The album's second single, "A Little More Summertime", was released on July 15, 2016. The album's third single, "Any Ol' Barstool", was released on December 5, 2016. The album's fourth and final single, the title track, was sent to country radio on May 8, 2017.

Commercial performance
They Don't Know debuted at number one on the Billboard 200, becoming Aldean's third album to top the chart. It earned 138,000 album-equivalent units, of which 131,000 were album sales.  The album has sold 430,500 copies in the United States as of February 2018.

Track listing

Personnel
 Jason Aldean – lead vocals
 Kurt Allison – electric guitar
 Kelsea Ballerini – duet vocals on "First Time Again"
 Blake Bollinger – drum programming
 Jaron Boyer – drum programming
 Perry Coleman – background vocals
 Tony Harrell – Hammond B-3 organ, piano, synthesizer
 Mike Johnson – steel guitar
 Tully Kennedy – bass guitar
 Rob McNelley – electric guitar
 Russ Pahl – steel guitar
 Danny Rader – bouzouki, acoustic guitar, hi-string guitar, tres
 Rich Redmond – drums, percussion
 Adam Shoenfeld – electric guitar
 Russell Terrell – background vocals
 Neil Thrasher – background vocals
 John Willis – acoustic guitar, hi-string guitar
 Jonathan Yudkin – cello

Chart positions

Weekly charts

Year-end charts

Singles

Certifications

References

2016 albums
Jason Aldean albums
BBR Music Group albums
Albums produced by Michael Knox (record producer)